Léon Lortie,  (August 31, 1902 – December 31, 1985) was a Canadian chemist, academic, and writer.

In 1930, he defended his thesis on cerium under the direction of Nathalie Demassieux.

In 1970, he was made an Officer of the Order of Canada in recognition for having "distinguished himself in many government and professional organizations".

References

External links
 Fonds Léon Lortie 

1902 births
1985 deaths
Canadian chemists
Fellows of the Royal Society of Canada
Officers of the Order of Canada